Institute of Food and Radiation Biology is a government research institute that studies food preservation methods through irradiation. The institute is part of the Bangladesh Atomic Energy Commission.

History
The institute was established on 1974 as the Irradiation and Pest Control Research Institute. In 1979 the institute was moved to Atomic Energy Research Establishment and renamed Institute of Food and Radiation Biology. The institute has an irradiation facility that offers its services at subsidized rate to Bangladeshi companies. The institute has a cobalt-60 gamma irradiator that is operated by the Gamma Source Division.

References

Government agencies of Bangladesh
Research institutes in Bangladesh
1974 establishments in Bangladesh
Organisations based in Savar
Food preservation